The 1978 Newham London Borough Council election for the Newham London Borough Council was held on 4 May 1978.  The whole council was up for election. Turnout was 26.8%. The Liberal Party didn't stand in the elections. The Labour Party held onto its overwhelming majority.

Election result

|}

Background
A total of 161 candidates stood in the election for the 60 seats being contested across 24 wards. Candidates included a full slate from the Labour Party, whilst the Conservative Party ran 33 candidates. Other candidates included 48 Residents & Ratepayers, 1 Communist and 16 National Front.

Results by ward

Beckton

Bemersyde

Canning Town & Grange

Castle

Central

Custom House & Silvertown

Forest Gate

Greatfield

Hudsons

Kensington

Little Ilford

Manor Park

Monega

New Town

Ordnance

Park

Plaistow

Plashet

St Stephens

South

Stratford

Upton

Wall End

West Ham

By-elections between 1978 and 1982

Central

The by-election was called following the death of Cllr. Henry E. L. Ronan.

South

The by-election was called following the resignation of Cllr. Joseph C. Taylor.

Castle

The by-election was called following the resignation of Cllr. Herbert G. Simpson.

Central

The by-election was called following the death of Cllr. Sidney A. Elson.

Wall End

The by-election was called following the resignation of Cllr. John Clark.

References

1978
1978 London Borough council elections